The following is a list of pipeline accidents in the United States in 2009. It is one of several lists of U.S. pipeline accidents. See also list of natural gas and oil production accidents in the United States.

Incidents 

This is not a complete list of all pipeline accidents. For natural gas alone, the Pipeline and Hazardous Materials Safety Administration (PHMSA), a United States Department of Transportation agency, has collected data on more than 3,200 accidents deemed serious or significant since 1987.

A "significant incident" results in any of the following consequences:
 fatality or injury requiring in-patient hospitalization
 $50,000 or more in total costs, measured in 1984 dollars
 liquid releases of five or more barrels (42 US gal/barrel)
 releases resulting in an unintentional fire or explosion

PHMSA and the National Transportation Safety Board (NTSB) post incident data and results of investigations into accidents involving pipelines that carry a variety of products, including natural gas, oil, diesel fuel, gasoline, kerosene, jet fuel, carbon dioxide, and other substances. Occasionally pipelines are repurposed to carry different products.

 On January 4, 2009, a 6.625-inch storage well line operated by Columbia Gas Transmission Company in Elk View (near Charleston), Kanawha County, West Virginia, ruptured due to internal corrosion pitting, complicated by low impact toughness of the pipe material, causing $29,011 in damage.
 On January 15, an accidental massive gas release at Pump Station 1 of the trans-Alaskan pipeline by Alyeska Pipeline Service Company threatened the site at the time. The company that runs the pipeline acknowledges a fire or explosion, had the gas ignited, could have imperiled the station's 60-plus workers and caused "an extended shutdown" of oil fields. There was no ignition or explosion. The incident occurred as BP workers used a cleaning device called a pig to swab oil out of an old pipeline the company was preparing to decommission. The 34-inch pipe was among major Prudhoe trunk lines found in 2006 to be ravaged with corrosion, due to BP's admitted lack of proper maintenance. A large volume of gas then bypassed the pig somehow, and rushed to Pump Station 1, a key asset through which every drop of oil coming off the North Slope must pass.
 On February 11, a gas pipeline exploded and burned near a natural gas treatment plant, near Carthage, Texas. There were no injuries.
 At approximately 5 p.m. on February 18, a rupture of pipeline near the pump station and terminal located in Cygnet, Ohio, owned by Philadelphia-based Sunoco, resulted in one of the largest oil spills in Wood County history. Upon learning of the release, the company immediately shut down the pipeline, stopped operations at the pump station and terminal, notified the appropriate authorities, and began an emergency response. As of 11:05 a.m. ET on February 19, the release had been stopped from the pipe. The damaged pipeline, which was operating at the time, released crude oil into a farm field. Eventually, about 19,000 gallons of the 52,500 gallons released were recovered. Some of the crude oil did contaminate a local creek. There were no fatalities, or injuries.
 On February 19, leaking gas was detected near homes, in Somerset, Massachusetts. Evacuations followed, but one resident who did not respond to knocking on doors was killed, when the gas exploded. Prior excavation damage to a gas main was the cause.
 On May 4, Kinder Morgan's Florida Gas Transmission pipeline burst near Palm City and Hobe City, Florida (near Port Salerno, Florida). The explosion ejected 106 feet of buried pipe weighing about 5,000 pounds out of the ground and onto the right-of-way between Interstate 95 and the Florida Turnpike (SR-91). The rupture was near a high school that was within the 366-foot potential impact radius. Two people were injured when their car ran off the road, and a Sheriff's deputy walked through a dense cloud and inhaled natural gas. The escaping gas did not ignite. The pipe was manufactured in 1959. The leak caused $596,218 in property damage. FGT was cited for safety violations: failing to identify a high-consequence area, failing to test operators for alcohol and drugs, and failing to have prompt emergency response; PHMSA assessed a $95,000 fine.
The cause of this failure was determined to be external corrosion. Additional work performed as a result of this order provided significant indications of external corrosion in various sections of this line. Pictures have been released around the area showing the damage caused. 52 people were evacuated in a one-mile (1.6 km) area of the explosion. No injuries reported.
 On May 21, an Enbridge pipeline pig sending trap in Superior, Wisconsin leaked from operator error, spilling about 6500 gallons of crude oil. 700 cubic yards of contaminated soil had to be removed.
 On July 15, an explosion occurred at Kinder Morgan's Midcontinent Express pipeline natural gas metering station that was under construction, while it was being pressure tested with nitrogen, in Smith County, Mississippi. One worker was killed, and two others injured. There was no fire. The workers were "literally right on top" of the explosion; their injuries were caused by pressure, not heat. One worker was injured when part of the pipe fell on him. The explosion snapped and bent a pipeline connected to a massive separator unit which was slung several yards.
 On August 10, operators of a Belle Fourche pipeline incorrectly operated the line, causing it to fail, near Edgerton, Wyoming. About 30,000 gallons of crude oil were spilled, with about 1,200 gallons being lost.
 On August 17, a pipeline was found leaking by an aerial patrol in Atoka County, Oklahoma.  of diesel fuel were estimated to have been released as a result of this accident, and none of it was recovered.
 On October 7, a leaking pipeline carrying jet fuel was accidentally ignited by a pipeline repair crew in Upton County, Texas.
 On October 28, Kinder Morgan's Natural Gas Pipeline Company of America above-ground storage tank north of St. Elmo, Illinois caught fire, injuring two workers. Welding caused the tank to ignite resulting in several explosions. Two workers were taken to the hospital.
 On November 5, two people were hurt when an El Paso Natural Gas pipeline exploded in the Texas Panhandle near Bushland, Texas. The orange inferno rose about 700 feet in the air; the blast incinerated the home of the Jose Torres family, injuring his wife Agnieszka and daughter Franczeska. About 200 residents in the area were evacuated. The failure was in an abandoned tap, but the exact failure reason remains unknown. The explosion cause $436,136 in property damage.
 On November 14, a fire at a gas compressor station near Cameron, West Virginia slightly burned one employee, and caused $5.6 million of damage to the facility.
 Also on November 14, 2009, a newly built 42-inch gas transmission pipeline near Philo, Ohio failed on the second day of operation. There was no fire, but evacuations resulted. Several indications of pipe deformation were found.
 From December 3 to 4, a Minnesota Pipeline carrying crude oil leaked in Todd County, Minnesota, spilling about 5,000 barrels of crude. Pipeline workers on December 3 had been repairing sections of the 16-inch pipe in a rural area, left on the afternoon of December 3, and the spill occurred during the evening hours of December 3–4.
 On December 23, a crude oil pipeline started leaking in Galveston, Texas. There was no fire or explosion as a result of the accident, and an estimated  of crude oil were released to the environment.

References 

Lists of pipeline accidents in the United States
2009 disasters in the United States